"Coming Home Now" is the sixth single taken from Irish boy band Boyzone's debut album, Said and Done (1995). It was their only single to be written solely by the group, without any outside co-writers. The song peaked at number four on the UK Singles Chart, becoming Boyzone's only solo single to miss the top three prior to their initial split in 2000. The song has received a silver sales certification for shipping 200,000 units in the UK. In Ireland, the song broke their consecutive string of four number-one hits by reaching number two.

Critical reception
British magazine Music Week rated the song four out of five, adding, "Boyzone should clinch a fifth consecutive top three hit with this sweet, self-penned ballad that has all the ingredients which have made the band so big, plus luscious strings arranged by Anne Dudley."

Track listings
UK CD single
 "Coming Home Now" (radio edit) – 3:41
 "Close to You" – 3:47
 "Coming Home Now" (Steve Jervier Mix) – 3:55

UK and European CD single (digipak)
 "Coming Home Now" (radio edit) – 3:41
 "Close to You" – 3:47
 "Coming Home Now" (Steve Jervier Mix) – 3:55
 "Coming Home Now" (Missing Link Mix) – 5:51

Japanese maxi-CD single
 "Coming Home Now" (radio edit)
 "Love Me for a Reason"
 "Father and Son"
 "Key to My Life"
 "Working My Way Back to You"

Charts

Weekly charts

Year-end charts

Certifications

References

1995 songs
1996 singles
Boyzone songs
Pop ballads
Songs written by Keith Duffy
Songs written by Michael Graham (singer)
Songs written by Ronan Keating
Songs written by Shane Lynch
Songs written by Stephen Gately